John Henry Scott (27 October 1915 – 19 July 1997) was an Australian rules footballer who played in the VFL from 1939 to 1945 for the Richmond Football Club.

Scott played in two consecutive VFL grand finals for the Tigers in 1942, going down to Essendon by 53 points, then in Richmond’s winning 1943 VFL grand final side, when they defeated the Bombers by 5 points.

Scott won the 1938 Central Gippsland Football League’s Rodda Medal when playing for Traralgon.

He also played for Williamstown in the VFA in 1941 after playing three of the first four games of the VFL season with the Tigers, and was then 'loaned' back to Richmond in 1942 for the duration of the VFA's recess for the Second World War. Scott returned to Williamstown in 1945 and played in five of the first eight rounds before being swapped back to the VFL Tigers in exchange for champion rover and goalkicker, Dick Harris. Scott played a total of 15 games for the VFA Seagulls in 1941 and 1945 without kicking a goal.

References 

 Hogan P: The Tigers Of Old, Richmond FC, Melbourne 1996

External links 

1915 births
1997 deaths
Traralgon Football Club players
Richmond Football Club players
Richmond Football Club Premiership players
Williamstown Football Club players
Australian rules footballers from Victoria (Australia)
One-time VFL/AFL Premiership players
People from Morwell, Victoria